Kim Hunter (born Janet Cole; November 11, 1922 – September 11, 2002) was an American theatre, film, and television actress. She achieved prominence for portraying Stella Kowalski in the original production of Tennessee Williams' A Streetcar Named Desire, which she reprised for the 1951 film adaptation, and won both an Academy Award and a Golden Globe Award for Best Supporting Actress.

Decades later, she was nominated for a Daytime Emmy Award for her work on the soap opera The Edge of Night. She also portrayed the chimpanzee Zira in Planet of the Apes (1968), and its sequels Beneath the Planet of the Apes (1970) and Escape from the Planet of the Apes (1971).

Early life
Hunter was born in Detroit, Michigan, the daughter of Grace Lind, who was trained as a concert pianist, and Donald Cole, a refrigeration engineer. She was of English and Welsh descent. Hunter attended Miami Beach High School.

Career
Hunter's first film role was in the 1943 film noir The Seventh Victim, and her first starring role was in the 1946 British fantasy film A Matter of Life and Death. In 1947, she was Stella Kowalski on stage in the original Broadway production of A Streetcar Named Desire. Recreating that role in the 1951 film version, Hunter won both the Academy and Golden Globe awards for Best Supporting Actress. In the interim, however, in 1948, she had already joined with Streetcar co-stars Marlon Brando, Karl Malden, and 47 others, to become one of the first members accepted by the newly created Actors Studio.

In 1952, Hunter became Humphrey Bogart's leading lady in Deadline USA.

Hunter was blacklisted from film and television in the 1950s, amid suspicions of communism in Hollywood, during the era of the House Un-American Activities Committee (HUAC).

In 1956, with the HUAC's influence subsiding, she co-starred in Rod Serling's Peabody Award-winning teleplay on Playhouse 90, "Requiem for a Heavyweight". The telecast won multiple Emmy Awards, including Best Single Program of the Year. She appeared opposite Mickey Rooney in the 1957 live CBS-TV broadcast of The Comedian, another drama written by Rod Serling and directed by John Frankenheimer. In 1959, she appeared in Rawhide in "Incident of the Misplaced Indians" as Amelia Spaulding. In 1962, she appeared in the NBC medical drama The Eleventh Hour in the role of Virginia Hunter in the episode "Of Roses and Nightingales and Other Lovely Things". In 1963, Hunter appeared as Anita Anson on the ABC medical drama Breaking Point in the episode "Crack in an Image". In 1964 Hunter appeared in the 'Alfred Hitchcock Hour' episode "The Evil of Adelaide Winters" in the title role. In 1965, she appeared twice as Emily Field in the NBC TV medical series Dr. Kildare. In 1967, she appeared in the pilot episode of Mannix. On February 4, 1968, she appeared as Ada Halle in the NBC TV Western series Bonanza in the episode "The Price of Salt".

Her other major film roles include the love interest of David Niven's character in the film A Matter of Life and Death (1946), and Zira, the sympathetic chimpanzee scientist in the 1968 film Planet of the Apes and two sequels. She also appeared in several radio and TV soap operas, most notably as Hollywood actress Nola Madison in ABC's The Edge of Night, for which she received a Daytime Emmy Award nomination as Outstanding Lead Actress in a Drama Series in 1980. In 1979, she appeared as First Lady Ellen Axson Wilson in the serial drama Backstairs at the White House.

Hunter starred in the controversial TV movie Born Innocent (1974) playing the mother of Linda Blair's character. She also starred in several episodes of the CBS Radio Mystery Theater during the mid-1970s. In 1971, she appeared in an episode of Cannon. In the same year, she starred in a Columbo episode "Suitable for Framing". In 1973, she appeared twice on Lorne Greene's short-lived ABC crime drama Griff, including the episode "The Last Ballad", in which she portrayed Dr. Martha Reed, a physician held by police in the death of a patient. In 1974, she appeared on Raymond Burr's Ironside. In 1977, she appeared on the NBC Western series The Oregon Trail starring Rod Taylor, in the episode "The Waterhole", which also featured Lonny Chapman.

Hunter's last film role in a major motion picture was in Clint Eastwood's 1997 film, Midnight in the Garden of Good and Evil. In it, Hunter portrayed Betty Harty, legal secretary for real-life Savannah lawyer Sonny Seiler.

Personal life
Hunter was married twice, first to William Baldwin, a Marine Corps pilot, in 1944. The couple had a daughter, Kathryn Deirdre (b. 1944), before divorcing two years later. She wed Robert Emmett in 1951.  They had a son, Sean Robert, in  1954. Hunter and Emmett would occasionally perform together in stage plays; he died in 2000.

Hunter was a lifelong progressive Democrat.  She died in New York City on September 11, 2002, of a heart attack at the age of 79.  Her ashes were given to her daughter—an attorney, civic leader, and former judge in Connecticut—after cremation.

Legacy
Hunter received two stars on the Hollywood Walk of Fame, one for motion pictures at 1615 Vine Street and a second for television at 1715 Vine Street.

Filmography

Film

Television

Awards and nominations

References

External links

 
 
 
 
 Kim Hunter scripts and rehearsal notes, 1957–1993, held by the Billy Rose Theatre Division, New York Public Library for the Performing Arts
 Kim Hunter papers, Additions 1925-2000, held by the Billy Rose Theatre Division, New York Public Library for the Performing Arts
 

1922 births
2002 deaths
American film actresses
American soap opera actresses
American stage actresses
American television actresses
American people of English descent
American people of Welsh descent
Art Students League of New York alumni
Best Supporting Actress Academy Award winners
Best Supporting Actress Golden Globe (film) winners
Donaldson Award winners
Hollywood blacklist
Miami Beach Senior High School alumni
Actresses from Detroit
20th-century American actresses
New York (state) Democrats
Michigan Democrats
California Democrats